Carriage is a wheeled vehicle for carrying people, especially horse-drawn.

Carriage may also refer to:

Vehicles
 Baby transport, also called a baby carriage (especially in North America) or pram, a four-wheeled pushed conveyance for reclining infants
 Gun carriage, an apparatus upon which a field gun is mounted for manoeuvring, firing, and transport
 Hose carriage, a wheeled vehicle for carrying a fire hose
 Railway carriage (especially in the British Isles and many Commonwealth countries), a railway vehicle (US: railroad car), part of a train for carrying people
 Undercarriage, the part of a moving vehicle that is underneath the main body of the vehicle, such as the:
Chassis, the undercarriage of a motor vehicle
Continuous track, the undercarriage of a tracked vehicle
Landing gear, the undercarriage of an aircraft or spacecraft

Arts, entertainment, and media 
 "The Carriage", an 1836 short story by Nikolai Gogol
The Carriage (opera), a 2009 opera by Vyacheslav Kruglik, based on Gogol's story

People 

 Leigh Carriage, Australian vocalist, educator and songwriter

Other uses
 Carriage, retransmission of broadcast signals, as in carriage dispute (a disagreement over the right to "carry", that is, retransmit, a broadcaster's signal)
 Carriage, conveyance of passengers or goods, as in Carriage of Passengers Act
 Carriage, part of a lace machine
 Shopping cart, alternative name for a shopping carriage
 Staircase carriage, the timber or iron joist supporting a wooden staircase
 Typewriter carriage, the part of a typewriter which moves the paper past the printing mechanism

See also
 
 
 Car (disambiguation)
 Carriage dispute
 Carriage of Passengers Act
 Carrier (disambiguation)
 Carry (disambiguation)